Al Majma'ah is a city and a governorate in Ar Riyad Province, Saudi Arabia. The city has an area of 30,000 square kilometres. The population of the town is around 45,000, while the population of the governorate as a whole is approximately 97,349. Al-Majma'ah Governorate borders the Eastern Province and Al-Qasim to the north, Thadig and Shaqra to the south, Rumah to the east, and Harmah, Al-Ghat and Zulfi to the west.

Founded in 1417 CE by an immigrant from the Alshammari tribe, Al-Majma'ah was historically considered the capital of the region of Sudair. It was an attractive place for many tribes such as Anazah and Shammar. The city today contains a museum as well as an impressive mud-brick fort that dates to the 18th century.

The city is covered in green during spring, which makes it a national destination. The Afia sudair supermarket is famous in Al Majma'ah. There are many private farms consisting mostly of palm trees, but other fruits or vegetables can grow there such as citrus or berry.

Notable people
 Adel al-JubeirSaudi Minister of State for Foreign Affairs
 Sheikh Abdulaziz al-TuwaijriFormer deputy head of the National Guard 
 Sheikh Hamad Abdullah Alsinani Former head of Majmaah chamber of commerce

See also 

 List of cities and towns in Saudi Arabia
 Regions of Saudi Arabia

Majma'ah
1417 establishments in Asia
 Populated places established in the 1410s
1410s in the Middle East